Allied Master Chemists of Australia Limited (Amcal) is an Australian pharmacy retailer and was founded by Major General C. H. Simpson on 13 July 1937, starting a movement that was to greatly influence pharmacy in Australia. The founding group consisted of 11 pharmacists.

The launch of Amcal to consumers was included personal letters to each household, window posters, a giveaway of a tablet of soap and a brochure entitled "Why this is an Amcal Pharmacy".

Australia
Originally Amcal was a buying group owned by the members who all had shares in the Amcal group. Amcal demutualised when Sigma Pharmaceuticals bought out the members shares in 2000 with the lure of more money and better centralised marketing. It is still a marketing group, however a franchise division of Amcal called Amcal Max is now marketing under a more competitive and compliant model. Between 2016 and 2017, some Amcal Pharmacies were converted to Terry White Chemmarts. There are now 223 Amcal pharmacies in Australia.

New Zealand
In New Zealand, Amcal was a pharmacy franchise. Amcal's marketing was managed by the owner of Amcal New Zealand, Pharmacybrands, a division of Australian Pharmaceutical Industries. The chain was re branded as Unichem in 2015.

References

External links
Australian Amcal website
New Zealand Amcal website

Health services companies of Australia
Pharmacies of Australia
Pharmaceutical companies of Australia
1937 establishments in Australia